Ray Mears' Northern Wilderness is a television series hosted by Ray Mears, showing Mears in Canada. The series is broadcast by the BBC.

Mears also released a book of the same title.

Synopsis
Ray Mears explores the Canadian wilderness. His journey begins in the Boreal Forest at the heart of Canada, where he examines and demonstrates the survival skills of the aboriginal people of the territory.
Episode 1 was filmed in Prince Albert National Park, Episode 2 was filmed along the French River in Ontario and Episode 6 was filmed in British Columbia.

See also
Extreme Survival
Ray Mears' Bushcraft
Wild Food
Survival with Ray Mears

External links

BBC television documentaries
Works about survival skills
2009 British television series debuts
2009 British television series endings